Edinburgh Castle was a Union-Castle Line steam ocean liner and refrigerated cargo ship that was launched in 1910 and sunk in 1945. In peacetime she was in liner service between Great Britain and South Africa.

Edinburgh Castle was an armed merchant cruiser (AMC) in the First World War and an accommodation ship in the Second World War.

She was the first of two Union-Castle liners called Edinburgh Castle. The second was launched in 1948 and scrapped in 1976.

Building

Harland and Wolff built Edinburgh Castle at Belfast, launching her on 27 January 1910 and completing her that April. When she was opened for public inspection on Whit Monday, 16 May 1910 about 1,000 people boarded her. On 21 May 1910 Edinburgh Castle sailed for South Africa. Edinburgh Castle and her sister ship Balmoral Castle were at the time the largest and most powerful vessels in the South African trade.

She had berths for 810 passengers: 320 in first class, 220 in second class, and 270 in third class. Her holds included  of refrigerated space.

Service
The ship was operated in line service until 1914, when the Admiralty requisitioned her as an armed merchant cruiser and had her armed with eight QF 6-inch naval guns.

Edinburgh Castle was sent from England with supplies and men for the Royal Navy squadron in the South Atlantic, joining the northern elements of Admiral Craddock's forces at their coaling base off the Brazilian coast on 12 October 1914. The ship was retained as part of the fleet to aid in the search for the German cruiser . On the redistribution of forces after the German victory at the Battle of Coronel Edinburgh Castle was left with two other British ships in the north until 19 November when detached carrying mail for England.

Edinburgh Castle was returned to her owners in 1918. In 1934 the call sign GLVR superseded her code letters HQSW. From 1938 Union-Castle stationed her at Southampton as reserve ship.

She was requisitioned again for wartime service in the second World War. She was moored at Freetown in Sierra Leone to accommodate survivors of sunken ships. After the war, it was deemed uneconomic to return her to the UK. She was sunk as a target west of Freetown.

Notes

References

External links

1910 ships
World War I Auxiliary cruisers of the Royal Navy
Ocean liners of the United Kingdom
Ships built in Belfast
Ships built by Harland and Wolff
Ships of the Union-Castle Line
Shipwrecks of Africa
Shipwrecks in the Atlantic Ocean
Steamships of the United Kingdom
World War I cruisers of the United Kingdom
World War II passenger ships of the United Kingdom